The 2019 Berlin ePrix (formally the 2019 BMW i Berlin E-Prix presented by CBMM Niobium) was a Formula E electric car race held at the Tempelhof Airport Street Circuit at Tempelhof Airport in the outskirts of Berlin on 25 May 2019. It was the tenth round of the 2018–19 Formula E season and the fifth edition of the event as part of the championship. The 37-lap race was won by Audi driver Lucas di Grassi after starting from third. Sébastien Buemi finished second in the Nissan e.dams, after starting from pole position. Jean-Éric Vergne, the championship leader going into Berlin, took third for Techeetah.

Report

Background
The Berlin ePrix was confirmed as part of Formula E's 2018–19 series schedule on June 7, 2018 by the FIA World Motor Sport Council. It's the tenth of thirteen scheduled single-seater electric car races of the 2018–19 season, and the fifth running of the event. The ePrix was held at the 2.375 km (1.476 mi) clockwise ten-turn Tempelhof Airport Street Circuit at Berlin Tempelhof Airport on 25 May 2019. 

Entering the race, Techeetah driver Jean-Éric Vergne was leading the Drivers' Championship with 87 points, followed by his teammate Andre Lotterer in second by only one point behind, and third placed Virgin Racing's driver Robin Frijns by just 6 points behind the championship leader. In the team's standings, Techeetah lead with 173 points, after both driver finished in the top 10, followed behind by Envision Virgin with 135 and defending constructors champions, Audi Sport Abt Schaeffler down in 3rd with 129 points, after both teams scoring no points in the last race.

After the previous round in Monaco, two drivers received three place grid penalties for causing collisions. Alexander Sims who collided with Di Grassi, and Frijns who collided with Sims.

Classification

Qualifying

Notes:
  – Alexander Sims and Robin Frijns received five place grid penalties for causing a collision in the previous race in Monaco

Race

Notes:
  – Fastest lap.
  – Pole position.

Standings after the race 

Drivers' Championship standings

Teams' Championship standings

 Notes: Only the top five positions are included for both sets of standings.

References

|- style="text-align:center"
|width="35%"|Previous race:2019 Monaco ePrix
|width="30%"|FIA Formula E Championship2018–19 season
|width="35%"|Next race:2019 Swiss ePrix
|- style="text-align:center"
|width="35%"|Previous race:2018 Berlin ePrix
|width="30%"|Berlin ePrix
|width="35%"|Next race:2020 Berlin ePrix
|- style="text-align:center"

Berlin ePrix
Berlin ePrix
Berlin ePrix
Berlin ePrix